Tomasz Paweł Pauszek (born 7 May 1978 in Bydgoszcz, Poland) – producer, composer, performer of electronic and experimental music. Also known for his single projects: Odyssey, and RND. He was one of the members of Waxfood, a band.

Education 
Pauszek graduated from the Academy of Bydgoszcz (now known as Kazimierz the Great University in Bydgoszcz, Poland), with an Artistic Education degree in Music which allows him to be a conductor, thanks to his specialization.

Artistic activity 
Pauszek started as a music producer in 1999. From 2000 to 2004 he was a co-organizer and a jury member of Synth Art Festival -  The Festival of Electronic Music in Bydgoszcz.

From 2004 to 2011 he was a participant and a concert maker during Warsaw Electronic Festivals. He creates music for television programs, music libraries and games.

He is the author of original albums oscillating around electronics, chillout and film music in a broad sense. Throughout his career, he actively gives concerts, treating each performance as a separate, independent, personally invented and directed project, packed with lasers, lights and the latest multimedia.

Discography

Cooperation with other artists 
Since the very beginning of his artistic career he has cooperated with many other artists. Among the Polish artists there were: Józef Skrzek, Janusz Grzywacz, Wojciech Konikiewicz, Krzysztof Duda, Przemysław Rudź, Łukasz Pawlak (City Songs), Jakub Kmieć (Polaris, Scamall), Remote Spaces (Krzysztof Horn, Konrad Jakrzewski), Gushito, Pawbeats, Meeting By Chance, Dagiel, Konrad Kucz, Arkadiusz Reikowski, Grzegorz Bojanek, and Władysław Komendarek.

He also has cooperated with foreign artists such as: Dickson Dee („8 Rooms” album), We Are The Hunters („Odyssey & We Are The Hunters” album), Flat Three, Thibault Cohade, and ISAN (Antony Ryan, Robin Saville).

Awards 
2004:  1st prize in a music competition organized during Warsaw Electronic Festival

2018: Big Red Button - award given by the "HighFidelity" magazine

2018: Best Recording 2018 - award for the best recorded album of 2018, given by the "HighFidelity" magazine

Important concerts 
 2001: Syntharsis Live Tour and Synth Art Festival 2001 – the tour promoting ″Syntharsis″ album 
 2003: Photoniques (Świecie) –  the concert opening a ″Homeless Gallery″ exhibition 
 2004: One Night In Warsaw (Warsaw, Karuzela Club) – the concert promoting ″Ypsilon Project″ album
 2004: Experiment.@ll (Warsaw) – the experimental concert presenting synthesis of electroacoustic avant-garde music with new electronic sounds
 2005: Distr@ctions – Experimental Tales by RND (Warsaw, Diuna Club) – the concert presenting minimalistic ambient music in the form of music stories
 2005: Live@Night (Warsaw, Polish BIS Radio) – the performance promoting experimental ambient in a broadcasting studio of Polish BIS Radio
 2006: Live Distracted (Warsaw) – the concert promoting ″Distracted″ album
 2006: Live From MÓZG (Bydgoszcz, Mózg Club) – the concert promoting ″Distracted″ album
 2007: Future Sessions (Warsaw, Polish BIS Radio ) – the conversation promoting electronic music combined with live performance from a broadcasting studio of BIS Radio
 2007: Aquality, Live in Aquarium (Warsaw, Akwarium Jazz Club) – Warsaw Electronic Festival concert
 2008: Live @ Summer Wave (Warsaw, Mandala Club) – Warsaw Electronic Festival concert
 2009: Music Of The Stars And Universe (Warsaw, Mandala Club) –International Astronomy Year concert introducing ″X-Space Odyssey″ album
 2010: MicroTOUR (Warsaw, Sopot) – three thematic concerts about science-fiction literature
 2011: Electronic Waves (Warsaw) – electronic part of the Warsaw Summer Jazz Days concert
 2012: Robofest 2012 (Pruszcz Gdański, OKSiR) – the concert in memory of Czesław Niemen 
 2018: LO-FI LI-VE (Warsaw - Riviera-Remont Club, Cekcyn - CEMF Festival) - a series of concerts promoting the ''LO-FI LO-VE'' album
 2019: 20 YEARS TOUR (Bydgoszcz - MCK, Straszyn - Toxin FM Radio, Grudziądz - Planetarium, Olsztyn - Planetarium, Warsaw - Heaven of Copernicus Planetarium) - The 20th anniversary of artistic work tour

Multimedia shows 
 2002: Cybernetic Ecology (Bydgoszcz-Myślęcinek) Synth Art Festival 2002 – two multimedia concerts using the art of lighting techniques, lasers and pyrotechnics. Included special performance of dancers, actors of pantomime ''Dar'' theatre and members of Knights Brotherhood
 2003: Net IQ (Bydgoszcz-Myślęcinek) – the multimedia show combining music and dancing with lights, lasers and pyrotechnics
 2003: The Elements of Sport – the opening of Youth European Athletics Championships
 2004: Europe (Bydgoszcz) Synth Art Festival 2004 – the multimedia concert using lights, lasers, pyrotechnics and large outdoor screens. Musicians, dancers and The Chamber Choir of Music Academy of Bydgoszcz under the direction of Janusz Stanecki were invited to take part in the performance. The  „Europe” show was performed to celebrate Poland joining the European Union
 2004: SPAR – The opening of European Cup in Athletics 2004

References

External links 
 Official website

1978 births
Living people
Polish electronic musicians
Kazimierz Wielki University in Bydgoszcz alumni
Experimental musicians
Polish record producers